The 2013 ACC Women's Championship was an international women's cricket tournament held in Chiang Mai Province, Thailand, from 23 to 31 January 2013. It was organised by the Asian Cricket Council (ACC).

Unlike the two previous ACC women's tournaments, where matches were played using the Twenty20 format, matches at the 2013 event were played over 25 overs. Eleven teams participated in the tournament, up from ten at the previous edition. Iran and Qatar returned to the competition for the first time since the 2009 tournament, while Oman did not return. The teams were divided into uneven groups of five and six, with the top two teams in each group progressing to the final. China, undefeated in the group stages, eventually met Thailand in the final, but were defeated by 17 runs. Thailand consequently qualified for the 2013 World Twenty20 Qualifier in Ireland, which was the qualification tournament for the 2014 World Twenty20.

Group stages

Group A

Group B

Finals

Semi-finals

Final

Placement matches

3rd-place play-off

5th-place play-off

7th-place play-off

9th-place play-off

Statistics

Most runs
The top five runscorers are included in this table, ranked by runs scored and then by batting average.

Source: CricketArchive

Most wickets

The top five wicket takers are listed in this table, ranked by wickets taken and then by bowling average.

Source: CricketArchive

Final standing

References 

2013
International women's cricket competitions in Thailand
International cricket competitions in 2013
2013 in Thai sport
2013 in women's cricket